The 2020 Missouri Valley Conference men's basketball tournament, popularly referred to as "Arch Madness", was a postseason men's basketball tournament that completed the 2019–20 season in the Missouri Valley Conference. The tournament was held at the Enterprise Center in St. Louis, Missouri from March 5 to 8, 2020.

Bradley defeated Valparaiso in the championship game to win the tournament for the second consecutive year. Normally, Bradley would have received the MVC's automatic bid to the NCAA tournament, however the NCAA Tournament was canceled due to the COVID-19 pandemic.

Seeds
Teams were seeded by conference record, with ties broken by the overall record in conference games played between the tied teams, then (if necessary) by NET Rating on the day following the conclusion of the regular season. The top six seeds received opening-round byes.

Schedule

Tournament bracket

References

Tournament
Missouri Valley Conference men's basketball tournament
Basketball competitions in St. Louis
College sports tournaments in Missouri
21st century in St. Louis
Missouri Valley Conference men's basketball tournament
Missouri Valley Conference men's basketball tournament